Human rights in Croatia are defined by the Constitution of Croatia, chapter three, sections 14 through 69.

There are numerous non-governmental organizations dealing with the issue in the country, as well as the Croatian Government's Office for Human Rights and several equality bodies, such as The Ombudsperson for Human Rights, Ombudsperson for Gender Equality, Children's Ombudsperson and The Disability Ombudsman.

Since independence

LGBT rights

Homosexuality was legalised in 1977. The age of consent was equalised in 1998. Homosexuals are not banned from military service.  In 2003, the Croatian government passed laws prohibiting discrimination based on sexual orientation in employment and education, the distribution of homophobic materials, and defamation of homosexuality and homosexuals.  Limited scope of rights were conferred upon same-sex couples after three years of cohabitation in 2003, but registered unions were not permitted until 2014. Since then Croatia provides all marital rights except joint adoption for registered and non-registered same-sex partnerships.

In November 2010, the European Commission's annual progress report on Croatia's candidacy stated that Croatia's numerous homophobic incidents are worrying since inquisitions need to make further efforts in combating hate crimes. The European Parliament, as stands in its 2010 resolution, “expresses its concern at the resentment against the LGBT minority in Croatia, evidenced most recently by homophobic attacks on participants in the Gay Pride parade in Zagreb; urges the Croatian authorities to condemn and prosecute political hatred and violence against any minority; invites the Croatian Government to implement and enforce the Anti-Discrimination Law”.

Historical situation
The following chart shows Croatia’s ratings since 1991 in the Freedom in the World reports, published annually by Freedom House. A rating of 1 is "free"; 7, "not free".

See also
Human trafficking in Croatia
Internet censorship and surveillance in Croatia
Political prisoners in Croatia

Notes
1.Note that the "Year" signifies the "Year covered". Therefore the information for the year marked 2008 is from the report published in 2009, and so on.
2.As of January 1.

References

External links
Croatian Helsinki Committee for Human Rights
Office for Human Rights of the Croatian Government
Amnesty International USA - Croatia's human rights violations
Human Rights Watch on Croatia
Justice at Risk: War Crimes Trials in Former Yugoslavia
2009 Country Report on Human Rights Practices in Croatia, released by the US DoS Bureau of Democracy, Human Rights, and Labor on March 11, 2010
Croatia Human Rights Practices, by the US Department of State in 1993
Report by T. Hammarberg, Commissioner for Human Rights of the Council of Europe, following his visit to Croatia from 6 to 9 April 2010
Croatia - Commission on Human Rights 
 Country Reports on Human Rights Practices - Croatia, by the US Department of State in 1996
Censorship in Croatia - IFEX

 
Politics of Croatia